Johannes Hendrik ("Jo") van den Broek, (4 October 1898 - 6 September 1978) was a Dutch architect influential in the rebuilding of Rotterdam after World War II.

Van den Broek was born in Rotterdam.  He joined with Johannes Brinkman in 1936, after the death of Brinkman's partner Leendert van der Vlugt. The firm's work during this time including a new terminal building for the Holland-America cruise line.

From 1948 onward, van den Broek worked with Jacob Bakema. After Brinkman's death, the architectural firm was known as Van den Broek and Bakema.  They collaborated to design landmarks and neighborhoods in Rotterdam and around the Netherlands, and participated in the 1957 Interbau project in Berlin.  Van den Broek died in The Hague, aged 79.

The firm still exists to this day and is now known as Broekbakema.

See also
List of Dutch architects

References

External links 
 Van den Broek & Bakema Architecture and Urban Design

1898 births
1978 deaths
Architects from Rotterdam
Delft University of Technology alumni